Bhatakuli is a town and a taluka in Amravati subdivision of Amravati district in Amravati revenue Division in the Berar region in the state of Maharashtra, India.
Bhatkuli has an ancient shiv temple for Vishwamitra, Waki Raipur, Nirul Gangamai, Himmatpur, Purna Nagar, Marki, Makarampur, Ashti, Hathkheda, Kholapur, Chinchkhed, Dhangarkhed, Wathoda Shukleshwar, sayat and many more villages. Also available various ancient temple like Ram mandir, Jain mandir etc.

Demographics 
As per Indian government census 2011, the population was 113109.

References 

Cities and towns in Amravati district
Amravati district
Talukas in Maharashtra